This is a list of members of the Tasmanian House of Assembly between the 21 August 1948 election and the 6 May 1950 election.

Notes
  Labor MHA for Wilmot and Speaker of the House, Peter Pike, died on 3 September 1949. A recount on 19 September 1949 resulted in the election of Labor candidate Douglas Cashion.
  Liberal MHA for Franklin, Reg Wright, resigned to contest a seat in the Australian Senate at the 1949 election. A recount on 8 November 1949 resulted in the election of Liberal candidate Archibald Park.

Sources
 
 Parliament of Tasmania (2006). The Parliament of Tasmania from 1856

Members of Tasmanian parliaments by term
20th-century Australian politicians